Dawsonia polytrichoides is a species of moss found in Australia. The stem is up to 20cm long, the calyptra is very large.

References

Polytrichaceae
Flora of New South Wales
Flora of Lord Howe Island
Flora of Queensland
Flora of Tasmania
Flora of Victoria (Australia)